Hypleurochilus is a genus of combtooth blennies found throughout the Atlantic Ocean.

Species
There are currently 11 recognized species in this genus:
 Hypleurochilus aequipinnis (Günther, 1861) (Oyster blenny)
 Hypleurochilus bananensis (Poll, 1959)
 Hypleurochilus bermudensis Beebe & Tee-Van, 1933 (Barred blenny)
 Hypleurochilus brasil Pinheiro, Gasparini & Rangel, 2013
 Hypleurochilus caudovittatus Bath, 1994 (Zebratail blenny)
 Hypleurochilus fissicornis (Quoy & Gaimard, 1824)
 Hypleurochilus geminatus (W. W. Wood, 1825) (Crested blenny)
 Hypleurochilus langi (Fowler, 1923)
 Hypleurochilus multifilis (Girard, 1858) (Featherduster blenny)
 Hypleurochilus pseudoaequipinnis Bath, 1994
 Hypleurochilus springeri J. E. Randall, 1966 (Orange-spotted blenny)

References

 
Salarinae